The Thielert Centurion is a series of Diesel cycle aircraft engines for general aviation originally built by Thielert, which was bought by Aviation Industry Corporation of China's Tecnify Motors subsidiary and is currently marketed by Continental Motors. They are based on heavily modified Mercedes-Benz automotive engines.

Design
All Centurion engines are water-cooled, turbocharged, and employ a single-lever power control (SLPC) associated with a Full Authority Digital Engine Control system (FADEC). This simplifies engine management for the pilot, as well as improving reliability as it prevents the engine being operated improperly. The series utilizes either jet fuel or diesel fuel. The high compression ratio of the engine combined with the digitally controlled fuel injection system mirrors similar advances in automotive technology.

Centurion series engines are always fitted with constant speed propellers which allow the engine to be operated at optimum speed at all times. However, the normal operating speed is too high for any suitable propeller and so the propeller is driven through a reduction gearbox. The constant speed propeller and reduction gear result in a propeller tip speed that is 10-15% lower than comparable conventional avgas engines, reducing propeller noise.

The Diesel engine's high compression results in better fuel efficiency and the higher operating rpm of the Centurion allows higher power to be developed from a smaller displacement, in comparison to conventional aircraft piston engines (i.e. engines that require leaded aviation gasoline with a very high octane rating).
 
A Centurion engine complete with CSU, reduction gearbox, turbocharger and FADEC engine management system is considerably heavier than the more conventional Continental and Lycoming engines which it competes against.  However, this weight disadvantage is compensated for by the Centurion's lower fuel consumption. Even though they lack the magnetos and spark plugs of conventional petrol (gas) piston engines, Centurion engines are considerably more complex.

Variants

Centurion 1.7 - Continental CD-135 (TAE 125-01)
The first product introduced by Thielert, a 1689 cm³ (103 in³) engine producing  is an inline-four engine based on the Mercedes-Benz OM668 from Mercedes-Benz A-Class A 170 CDI (W168) with 80 mm bore and 84 mm stroke.

The engine produces more power than a Lycoming O-320 above 4,000 ft, can maintain 93 kW (125 hp) till FL120, and burns  in cruise at FL175 for 72 kW (97 hp): .

More than 1,500 Centurion 1.7s had been built until the end of 2006 when it was replaced by the Centurion 2.0. The in-service record of the 1.7 has been poor.

A combination of design, service and support issues caused widespread customer dissatisfaction.
Diamond then designed its own Austro Engines as an alternative to Thielert.

The engines were later marketed as the CD-135 by Continental Engines and produced in St. Egidien, Germany before being granted final assembly in Fairhope, Alabama for the U.S. retrofit market in 2015.

Centurion 2.0 (TAE 125-02-99)
Introduced in late 2006. The main difference is a new Mercedes-Benz OM640 engine cylinder block from the Mercedes-Benz A 200 CDI (W169) with a displacement of 1991 cm3 (Ø83 x 92 mm). Other improvements include a more compact FADEC, a lighter cast gearbox housing, interfaces for glass cockpits and a new service tool that allows the FADEC to be programmed in the field. Dimensions of the Centurion 2.0 and 1.7 are nearly identical and the install kits are compatible, so a 1.7 at the end of its life can be replaced with a 2.0. It has accumulated more than 1,000,000 flight hours without mechanical failures as of April 2008.

Centurion 2.0 S (TAE 125-02-114)
This 4-cylinder turbodiesel common rail direct injection with redundant FADEC control offers  providing a significant power increase compared to the  Centurion 2.0 for no additional weight. An engine kit may cost $89,000.

Centurion 3.0
Certified 20 June 2017 by Technify Motors GmbH (application: 19 December 2013), 2987 cm³ V6 four stroke Diesel piston engine with common rail high pressure direct fuel injection, turbocharger, 1:1.66 gearbox and electronic Engine Control Unit. 980 mm Length × 700 mm Height × 790 mm Width, 265 kg dry, 221 kW (300 HP) for 5 min, 202 kW (272 HP) Max. Continuous, both at 3880 rpm (2340 prop rpm) Same dimensions as the Mercedes-Benz OM642.

Centurion 3.2
Intended to fill the gap between the Centurion 2.0 and the 4.0 and designed to produce .  Development is largely complete, but the project is on hold.

Centurion 4.0

Designed as a larger engine to replace the  gasoline engines and developed from the Mercedes-Benz OM629 automobile engine, it produced 350 hp (261 kW) later with a larger single turbocharger.

After the insolvency of Thielert in April 2008 all work on the Centurion 4.0 was frozen.

Continental CD-155
The engine must be replaced every 2,100 hours, the gearbox  has to be replaced for an inspection at 900 hours, the high-pressure pump has a life limit of 600 hours, the alternator of 600 hours, friction disk of 900 hours, V-ribbed belt of 1,200 hours, alternator excitation battery of 12 months. Fuel, oil, and cooling lines are replaced at 60 months except for the Robin DR400 where these items are 'on condition' with no set life-limit. The dual mass flywheel, which is intended to have the same life as the engine, is tested in-situ at 1,200 hours.

 TAE 125-02-125 (Continental CD-170)
A four-cylinder, liquid-cooled  diesel engine with FADEC, dual overhead camshafts and a common rail direct fuel injection system, weighting  and certified by the EASA on 22 July 2020.

Continental CD-300
The CD-300 should replace the Safran/SMA diesel engine for the five-seat, single-engine Diamond DA50 from the third quarter of 2020 after a first flight of the combination on 22 March 2019, with a cruise fuel burn of 34.8l/h (9.2USgal/h).

Applications

Centurion 1.7
 Diamond DA40-TDI Star
 Diamond DA42 Twin Star
 Apex Aircraft Robin DR400 135 CDI Ecoflyer
 Cessna 172 ("F" and later models, modified under a Supplemental Type Certificate)
 General Atomics MQ-1C Gray Eagle

Centurion 2.0
 Diamond DA42 Twin Star
 Diamond DA40
 Cessna 172 ("F" and later models, modified under a Supplemental Type Certificate)
 Robin DR400 Ecoflyer
TAI Anka Turkish Aerospace Industries MALE UAV
Piper PA-28 Cherokee (modified under a Supplemental Type Certificate)
Piper PA-28 Archer DX
 Airbus Helicopters VSR700 naval UAV based on the Cabri G2

Centurion 3.2
 Cessna 182 - Proposed STC

Centurion 4.0
Cirrus SR-22 (STC)
Cessna 206 (STC)
Hybrid Air Vehicles HAV 304 Airlander 10

Continental CD-155
Cessna Turbo Skyhawk JT-A - new production aircraft with engine installation under an STC
Glasair Sportsman 2+2 - experimental homebuilt aircraft

See also

References

External links
 Centurion engines home page
 EASA Type Certificate Centurion 1.7 / 2.0 
 EASA Type Certificate Centurion 4.0

Aircraft diesel engines
2000s aircraft piston engines

de:Thielert Centurion 1.7